Skulduggery Pleasant: The Dying of the Light is young adult and fantasy novel written by Irish author Derek Landy, published in August 2014. It is the ninth and final of the first Skulduggery Pleasant series and follows to Skulduggery Pleasant: Last Stand of Dead Men.

The book was planned to be released in the US and Canada in 2018.

In 2014, The Dying of the Light was shortlisted for the Senior Irish Children's Book of the Year.

Plot summary

The story follows the sorcerer and detective Skulduggery Pleasant after the loss of Valkyrie Cain, as he allies with his former protegé's murderous reflection to track down and stop Darquesse before she destroys the world.

Critical response
Sarah Webb, writing for The Independent, said
"With plot twists that had me gasping at Landy's audacity, whip-smart dialogue, and enough clever popular culture references to impress even the most jaded teenager, this is a world class book not to be missed.".

References

External links

Skulduggery Pleasant UK, Australia and New Zealand Official Website
Skulduggery Pleasant US and Canada Official Website

2014 Irish novels
Irish fantasy novels
Skulduggery Pleasant books
HarperCollins books
2014 children's books